Mehreen Mahmud mostly known by her stage name Mehreen, is a Bangladeshi singer.

Biography
She studied in Viqarunnisa Noon School and Holy Cross College. She completed her master's degree in English literature from the University of Dhaka, after 3 years Honours.

Mehreen's debut album, Anari, was released in 2000. Don't Forget Me was released in 2006, and Tumi Acho Bole in 2008. She is a jazz-fusion-pop artist. She was a Bangladeshi Idol judge for season 1 in 2012.

Discography

Solo
As of 2022, she has released eight solo albums:
 Anari (2000)
 Dekha Hobe (2002)
 Mone Pore Tomaye (2004)
 Bhalobashar Gaan: A Romantic Compilation (2005)
 Don't Forget Me (2006)
 Tumi Acho Boley (2008)
 SE7EN (2017)
 Bondhuta (2018)

References

External links 
 
 
 

Living people
21st-century Bangladeshi women singers
21st-century Bangladeshi singers
University of Dhaka alumni
Year of birth missing (living people)